Apti Khamzatovich Aukhadov (born 18 November 1992) is a Russian weightlifter competing in the 85 kg category. He is of Chechen descent.

Career
Aukhadov was the world junior champion in 2010 and won silver at the 2011 European Weightlifting Championships. He initially was awarded the silver medal at the 2012 Summer Olympics in the men's 85 kg category with a total of 385 kg. Aukhadov took gold at the 2013 World Weightlifting Championships with a combined total of 387 kg.

In June 2016, it was announced by IWF that retests of the samples taken from the 2012 Olympics indicated that Aukhadov had tested positive for prohibited substances, namely Dehydrochloromethyltestosterone and Drostanolone. If confirmed, Aukhadov faced losing his Olympic medal and all results and medals earned from the date of the sample in 2012 to 2016. In October 2016, he was stripped of his Olympic medal.

References

External links
 
 
 
 

1992 births
Living people
Chechen people
People from Chechnya
Russian male weightlifters
Weightlifters at the 2012 Summer Olympics
Olympic weightlifters of Russia
Competitors stripped of Summer Olympics medals
Doping cases in weightlifting
Russian sportspeople in doping cases
World Weightlifting Championships medalists
Universiade medalists in weightlifting
Universiade gold medalists for Russia
European Weightlifting Championships medalists
Sportspeople from Chechnya
20th-century Russian people
21st-century Russian people